The 2017–18 Scandinavian Cup was a season of the Scandinavian Cup, a Continental Cup season in cross-country skiing for men and women. The season began on 15 December 2017 in Vuokatti, Finland and concluded with a stage event 23–25 February 2018 in Trondheim, Norway.

Calendar

Men

Women

Overall standings

Men's overall standings

Women's overall standings

References 

Scandinavian Cup
Scandinavian Cup seasons
2017 in cross-country skiing
2018 in cross-country skiing